Lenore may refer to:


Arts and entertainment
"Lenore" (poem), by Edgar Allan Poe
Lenore, an unrelated character in the poem "The Raven", also by Edgar Allan Poe
"Lenore" (ballad), a 1773 poem by Gottfried August Bürger
"Lenore" (melodrama), a melodrama by Franz Liszt after Gottfried August Bürger's ballad
Symphony No. 5 (Raff), a symphony by Joachim Raff entitled "Lenore"
the title character of Lenore, the Cute Little Dead Girl, a comic series

Places
Lenore, Idaho, an unincorporated community
Lenore, West Virginia, an unincorporated community
Lake Lenore (Washington)
Lenore Lake (Saskatchewan), Canada

People
Lenore (given name), a list of people

See also
Leonore (disambiguation)
Lenora (disambiguation)
Lenor, a fabric softener
Eleanor (disambiguation)